The 2006 Mini Challenge season was the fifth season of the Mini Challenge UK. The season started on 1 April at Snetterton Motor Racing Circuit and ended on 22 October at Donington Park. The season featured seven rounds across the UK and one in Belgium.

Calendar

Entry list

Championship standings
Scoring system
Championship points were awarded for the first 15 positions in each Championship Race. Entries were required to complete 75% of the winning car's race distance in order to be classified and earn points. There were bonus points awarded for Pole Position and Fastest Lap.

Championship Race points

Drivers' Championship

Cooper S Class

Cooper Class

2006 in British motorsport
Mini Challenge UK